Allanbank is a village near Allanton, in the Scottish Borders area of Scotland, in the historic county of Berwickshire.

Allanbank Chapel was dedicated to St. Mary and was located in a small field named Chapel Haugh.
Nearby places include  Blackadder Water, Duns, Earlston, Edrom, Gavinton, Kelloe, Kimmerghame House, and the Whiteadder Water.

See also
Pearlin Jean
List of places in the Scottish Borders

References
 Ewart, G (2008c) 'Allanbank House, Scottish Borders (Edrom parish), monitoring', Discovery Excav Scot, New, vol.9 Cathedral Communications Limited, Wiltshire, England. Page 157
 Strang, C A (1994) 'Borders and Berwick:an illustrated architectural guide to the Scottish Borders and Tweed valley, RIAS / Landmark Trust series (Edinburgh), page 39
 Cowan, I B (1967), 'The parishes of medieval Scotland, Edinburgh.
 Ferguson, J (1892) 'Notices of remains of pre-reformation churches, etc., in Berwickshire'.

External links
CANMORE/RCAHMS record of Allanbank, Allanbank House
RCAHMS record of Allanbank, Chapel, East Nesbit
Geograph image: Woodlands, Allanbank
Times Online, 27 September 2009: Scottish Homes / Allanbank House plot for sale

Villages in the Scottish Borders